The Ministry of Transport (Abrv: MOT;) is the ministry of the Government of Thailand responsible for the development, construction, and regulation of the nation's land, marine, and air transportation systems.

History

The Ministry of Transport was previously known as the Ministry of Communications (although the name is the same in Thai), and was founded in 1941. Its English name was changed to the Ministry of Transport in 2002, when the Reorganisation of Ministries, Government Agencies and Departments, B.E. 2545 Act came into force. It stipulated that the Ministry of Transport (the former Ministry of Communications) would have overall responsibility for transportation, transportation-related businesses, traffic planning, and transport infrastructure development.

, the ministry is headed by Transport Minister Saksayam Chidchob.

Organization
The MOT is composed of ministry departments and profit-making state enterprises.

Departments
 Office of the Minister
 Office of the Permanent Secretary
 Marine Department
 Department of Land Transport (DLT)
 Department of Airports (DOA)
Civil Aviation Authority of Thailand (CAAT)
 Department of Highways (DOH)
 Department of Rural Roads (DRR)
 Office of Transport and Traffic Policy and Planning (OTP)
 Department of Rail Transport (DRT)

State enterprises
 State Railway of Thailand (SRT)
 Port Authority of Thailand (PAT)
 Mass Rapid Transit Authority of Thailand (MRTA)
 Expressway Authority of Thailand (EXAT)
 Bangkok Expressway and Metro Public Company Limited (BEM)
 Bangkok Mass Transit Authority (BMTA)
 
 
 The Airports of Thailand Public Company Limited (AOT)
  
 Suvarnabhumi Airport Hotel Co, Limited
 THAI-AMADEUS Southeast Asia Company Limited
 Airport Rail Link Co, Limited

References

 
Thailand
Transport
Transport organizations based in Thailand